The women's 4×100 metre freestyle relay was a swimming event held as part of the swimming at the 1928 Summer Olympics programme. It was the fourth appearance of the event, which was established in 1912. The competition was held on Thursday 9 August 1928.

The United States replaced two swimmers between the semi-finals and the final, while France replaced one. Thirty-one swimmers from seven nations competed.

Note: The International Olympic Committee medal database shows only these four swimmers from the United States as gold medalist. Susan Laird and Josephine McKim both swam in the semi-final are not credited with medals.

Records
These were the standing world and Olympic records (in minutes) prior to the 1928 Summer Olympics.

The United States with Adelaide Lambert, Josephine McKim, Susan Laird, and Albina Osipowich set a new world record in the semi-final with 4:55.6 minutes. In the final the United States with Adelaide Lambert, Albina Osipowich, Eleanor Garatti, and Martha Norelius bettered the world record to 4:47.6 minutes.

Results

Semifinals

Semifinal 1

Semifinal 2

Final

References

External links
Olympic Report
 

Swimming at the 1928 Summer Olympics
1928 in women's swimming
Women's events at the 1928 Summer Olympics